The Hotel Alba Caracas is the first 5 star hotel in Venezuela. It is located in the cultural and financial center of Caracas, between Av. Mexico with Av. Sur 25. It overlooks El Ávila National Park and Los Caobos Park and has direct access to the Caracas Metro.

History
In the 1930s, coffee plantations covered the hotel site. In 1944 the area became the first corporate headquarters of Creole Petroleum. In 1955 the headquarters became a National Security government building government of Marcos Pérez Jiménez.

In 1965, engineer Juan Sánchez Carranza was designated to manage construction of a residential building for the middle class, in which only about 90% of the work had been achieved. It was first named Hotel Gran Caracas. 

After much reconstruction it was inaugurated in 1969 with the name of Hotel Caracas Hilton.

Skyscrapers in Venezuela
Buildings and structures in Caracas
Skyscraper hotels
Hotel buildings completed in 1976
Hotels in Venezuela